Tauno Matomäki (born 14 April 1937, Nakkila, Finland) is a vuorineuvos (honorary title granted by the president of Finland) honorary doctorate in engineering and a Diplomi-insinööri. He was the President and CEO of Rauma-Repola Oy from 1987 to 1990, the President and CEO of Repola Oyj from 1991 to 1996 and the Chairman of the Board of UPM-Kymmene.
His son Tommi Matomäki has served as the managing director of Technip Offshore Finland's Mäntyluoto shipyard.

References

1937 births
Living people